Steindöbra is a river of Saxony, Germany. Above from its junction with Steinbach, it also takes the name of Mühlbach. It is a right tributary of the Brunndöbra, which it joins in Klingenthal.

Its spring is located roughly 850m above sea level near the top of Mühlleiten pass in the western Ore Mountains. It flows south, traversing Sachsenberg-Georgenthal, a district of Klingenthal. After approximately three kilometers, it unites with Brunndöbra and hence continues as Döbra, which in turn unites with the Zwota, its waters thus flowing via Ohře and Elbe into the North Sea.

Before flowing into Brunndöbra, a large portion of its course runs side by side with the track of the former meter-gauge light rail.

See also
List of rivers of Saxony

Rivers of Saxony
Rivers of Germany